University of Georgetown may refer to:
 Georgetown University, in Georgetown, Washington, D.C.
 University of Guyana, in Georgetown, Guyana